"El Beso" is a song recorded by the Spanish singer-songwriter Pablo Alborán. The song was released as the second single from his second studio album Tanto (2012). It was released in December 2012 as a digital download in Spain. The single peaked at number 1 on the Spanish Singles Chart in February 2013

Music video
An acoustic video for the song was released on 27 October 2012. 
The official music video for "El Beso" was released on 8 February 2013.

Track listing

Chart performance

Weekly charts

Year-end charts

Release history

See also
 List of number-one singles of 2013 (Spain)

References

2012 singles
2012 songs
Pablo Alborán songs
Number-one singles in Spain
EMI Records singles
Songs written by Pablo Alborán